Jorge Ruiz (born January 22, 1958 in San Andrés, in the province of Buenos Aires), is a former field hockey player from Argentina, who later became a coach in his sport and guided the Men's National Team – first as an assistant, later as head coach – at the 1992, 1996, 2000 and 2004 Summer Olympics. After the 2005 Men's Hockey Champions Challenge he resigned and was replaced by Argentina's women's head coach Sergio Vigil.

References

External links
 

1958 births
Living people
Argentine male field hockey players
Argentine field hockey coaches
Olympic field hockey players of Argentina
Field hockey players at the 1976 Summer Olympics
Place of birth missing (living people)
Pan American Games medalists in field hockey
Pan American Games silver medalists for Argentina
Field hockey players at the 1983 Pan American Games
Medalists at the 1983 Pan American Games